Yellow Creek is a stream in the U.S. state of South Dakota. It is a tributary of Whitewood Creek with the confluence south of Lead, South Dakota.

It was named for the yellow color of its water, which comes from limestone and sandstone deposits.

See also
List of rivers of South Dakota

References

Rivers of Lawrence County, South Dakota
Rivers of South Dakota